Hockey at the 1948 Olympics may refer to:

Ice hockey at the 1948 Winter Olympics
Field hockey at the 1948 Summer Olympics